Luís Vaz Jorge (born 29 October 1943) is a Portuguese former swimmer. He competed in two events at the 1960 Summer Olympics.

References

External links
 

1943 births
Living people
Portuguese male swimmers
Olympic swimmers of Portugal
Swimmers at the 1960 Summer Olympics
Swimmers from Lisbon